Ugljevik is a town and municipality located in Republika Srpska, an entity of Bosnia and Herzegovina. As of 2013, it has a population of 15,710 inhabitants, while the town of Ugljevik has a population of 4,155 inhabitants.

The municipality is located in the countryside of the eastern foothills of Mount Majevica, where the mountains start descending towards the flatlands of Semberija, to which it is tied more than any other surrounding area. It is the home of miners and other energy resource professionals.

Name
Ugljevik was named for the coal, which first began to be exploited on Mount Majevica in 1899.

History
Coal production has been exploited on Mount Majevica since 1899. Within a century, the local inhabitants developed the initial small dig into today’s surface mine producing 6,000 tonnes of coal per day and the coal-fired power plant “Termoelektrana Ugljevik” (Ugljevik Power Plant), supplying the Republic with 300 megawatts of electricity. Preparations are underway for the construction of another power-plant of 600 MW. Exploration indicates huge reserves of quality coal, with seams stretching in every direction, even reaching Zvornik on the Drina river. The administrative center of the Municipality was the village of Zabrdje, to be transferred to the mining community of Ugljevik (now named Stari Ugljevik (Old Ugljevik)) in 1941, after Zabrdje was burned by Ustaše. The present-day Ugljevik began to be built in 1980 in the valley of Janja river (one of the Drina’s tributaries) between Zabrdje, Stari Ugljevik, Bogutovo Selo and Ugljevicka Obrijez, in answer to the need for increasing the surface mining operations and building the power-plant. The whole of the old Ugljevik was then moved to this new site.

At least ten archaeological locations have been found in the area. These include five locations with groupings of medieval stone sarcophagi, called stećci, and three dating from the Roman period. Though research into Neolithic sites in the municipality is lacking, near-by areas have Neolithic archaeological sites, allowing postulation that there might have been ancient sites present. The village of Tutnjevac contains the remains of a Roman villa.

The first population census of the region showed five settlements with a total of 55 houses, which date from prior to arrival of Ottoman Turks in the 15th century. During troubled times the population would leave these parts with most of the succeeding population—the forebears of the present Majevicans—coming from Eastern and ‘Old’ Herzegovina in the 19th century.

During the past hundred years, the pace and extent of development of the Ugljevik region has been determined by coal production. With the increased need for coal, coal exploitation began in 1899, and a narrow gauge railway was built from Rača, on the Sava river, to the Ugljevik coal-mine via Bijeljina in 1919. Subsequently, this railway was upgraded to normal narrow gauge, and later was connected to one of Ugljevik’s communities, Mezgraja, in 1938. This was the last narrow-gauge railway in the Europe before it was closed on May 26, 1979.

The coal from Bogutovo Selo surface mine has a calorific value of 2,550 kcal/kg (10.68 MJ/kg), and it is estimated that the reserves are sufficient to satisfy the needs of four 300 megawatt coal-fired power plants.

It is thanks to these coal giants that almost all of Ugljevik’s corporations developed.

After the Bosnian War Ugljevik became a significant peacekeeping force post. For the first time after the World War II, Russian Army and Western Allies worked together in a military mission, as Implementation Force (IFOR) and later Stabilization Forces (SFOR). Headquarters of Russian Peacekeeping Mission in Bosnia was in Ugljevik. Americans had a small base in Ugljevik, across the Janja river from the Russians. In relation to this, IFOR info magazine “Talon” wrote in one of its issues “Cold War melted on the Balkan sun”.

Location
The Municipality of Ugljevik borders to the East and North on the Municipality of Bijeljina, with Lopare Municipality marking the West and Zvornik Municipality the South boundaries, and in the South also touching on Teočak Municipality in the BiH Federation. The 1993 population census indicated a population of 16,456 residing in 4,733 households, in this Municipality covering . The population density is 12.44/km², thi being the result of dispersed nature of the communities.

Ugljevik is located on the inter-Entity Bijeljina-Tuzla highway—built in 1971—which connects it to all the surrounding regions, with asphalt roads branching off the highway towards Zabrdje, Trnova and other communities. It is now possible to reach every village in Ugljevik municipality by car. This, coupled with other circumstances—primarily the fine infrastructure, employment opportunities, healthy environment and proximity to populous towns—contribute to the municipality’s towns developing quickly and the residents choice to remain in them. Despite the destruction of the recent war and the postwar hardships of recovery, new houses are replacing old at every step.

Territorial organisation
The Municipality of Ugljevik has the following 21 communities:

 Korenita
 Maleševci
 Zabrdje
 Ugljevička Obrijež
 Stari Ugljevik
 Ugljevik Selo
 Gornje Zabrdje
 Ravno Polje
 Bogutovo Selo
 Gornja Krćina
 Gornja Trnova
 
 Modran
 Donje Zabrđe
 Janjari (Atmačići)
 Srednja Trnova
 Glinje
 Sarije
 Mukat
 Stankovići
 Donja Trnova
 Akmačići

Demographics

Population

Ethnic composition

Culture 

Culture in these parts is gaining momentum. Numerous cultural events are presented at the Cultural Center.
Cultural Club Rudar was founded in 1976 and in the composition of the club work: folk dance ensemble, drama and recitation section, original (authentic) creative work, folk music orchestra. With its good programme the Club takes part in all important manifestations in the municipality and economy collectives and they also often had their performances in other municipalities.

Building of Cultural Center “Filip Višnjić” was opened in 2006, and it is replica of Mine Head Office („Direkcija“ building) in Stari Ugljevik. Original building was built in 1921, but due to removal of Ugljevik on new location it was abandoned. New building is a center of rich cultural life in municipality and region.

Religion

Religion assumed its traditional place in the last decade among the lives of the local populace. In addition to the existing churches in Zabrdje, Tutnjevac, Stari Ugljevik, which all shared the fate of their faithful, new Orthodox churches are being built. The most impressive one is in Ugljevik, dedicated to the protesters of Ugljevik and the Municipality, Holy Mother Paraskeva. The church was built in the traditional Serbian-Byzantine Church style, and dominates the town.

Mosques are also being rebuilt, after the war, in villages (Janjari, Atmačići, Glinje, Srednja Trnova).

Education

Education has a long  tradition in the Municipality of Ugljevik. An elementary school was founded in Zabrdje in 1875. The town was at the time the largest settlement in this part of Majevica, since it was located on the Bijeljina-Tuzla road. In the year of 1995 town marked the 120th anniversary of its school, making Zabrdje, one of privileged communities of Majevica and Semberija to have their own school for quite some time.

The second school to open in these parts began lesson in 1890 in Korenita. It was followed two years later by the opening of a school in Ugljevik. After the Second World War, village schools appeared in other Ugljevik communities—Tutnjevac, Malesevci, Trnova, Mezgraja, Bogutovo Selo, Ugljevicka Obrijez and other communities. All school-age children attend classes. School building are modern and well equipped, with an adequate number of teachers ensuring a high standard of education. Two thousand pupils attend Ugljevik Municipality schools each year.

Ugljevik also has a Secondary School training future energy technicians, covering the trades needed most by the Ugljevik Termoelektrana (Power Plant). Despite a number of Ugljevik students attending school in Bijeljina secondary schools, and vice versa, Ugljevik still has 600 students.

Natural environment
The Ugljevik region includes the now evaporated Pannonian Sea. It had once reached above New Ugljevik, its waves cutting into the mountainside above the school complex where fossilised traces of aquatic flora and fauna are visible. Above Old Ugljevik lie the Medieval remains of the fortress Jablangrad.
Udrigovo Peak, where a radio-TV relay tower was built after the war, rises above the Ugljevik region. Udrigovo is known for its thick oak stands.
Majevica's hills have a number of forests, with the black oak being well-known in Udrigovo. Plans are being made to protect the forests and natural environment of the region and the Nature Reserves in Bogutovo Selo and Lazarevici, while maintaining lumber production. These are also the conditions necessary to the development of recreation and various forms of tourism in the region. This should be kept in mind when planning to expand surface coal exploitation or build new roads. Forest of sessile oak, black oak and other varieties can be found at Bogutovo Selo, Korenita and Lazarevic, as elsewhere.

Tourism

The village of Krćina, in the direction of Zvornik, has great potential for the development of village tourism, it being located in natural surroundings and possessing a cave nearby known by the local population as the cave of the epic hero Starina Novak. Nearby is also located the Tavna Monastery, dating to Middle Ages. The village is accessible from the Podrinje, from the direction of Loznica, Jadar, Radjevina, Zvornik and Bijeljina. The road is partly macadam, and once fully asphalted it will be the shortest way to reach Ugljevik and Majevica from Podrinje.

In the valley of the little river Domana is located another cave, the Suplja Pecina, while in the cliff on Baljak hill is Kurtina Pecina.

Economy

The Ugljevik Power Plant (300 Megawatt coal-fired power station with 310 metre tall chimney) is located in the municipality.

The following table gives a preview of total number of registered people employed in legal entities per their core activity (as of 2018):

Sport
Sport and physical culture are on the rise in Ugljevik. The pride of these parts is the Football Club Rudar, which has won the most important trophies and titles in Republika Srpska and spread the name of Ugljevik throughout the Republic. The Club is a wellspring of talented players, and its successes have inspired the development of soccer in neighbour municipalities as well. Village soccer clubs and school soccer teams have increased and improved their programmes also.

Basketball and other sports are on the rise. Great attention is being paid the construction of sports facilities—soccer stadium, swimming pool, universal gym—while minor sports facilities are available for the youth in the vicinity of the elementary and secondary schools.

The Rudar Karate Club is a young sports club, but this does not prevent it from achieving high results in numerous domestic and international karate meets. Competition began with county and regional meets, to finally progress to the world karate scene, it being of exceptional quality past years.

The Rudar Basketball Club was founded in 1984 and belongs to the Prime League of Republika Srpska. The club stopped operating in 1989, to renew itself in 1994 with great strides towards the Republic’s basketball elite.

Rudar is also the name of chess club, which, through its competitions and work at popularising this ancient game, proudly represents the name of Rudar.

Volleyball, judo and bowling are also represented in Rudar sport’s family.

There are additionally nine soccer clubs in the various villages: Partizan in Donja Trnova, Mladost in Bogutovo Selo, Buducnost in Ravno Polje, Strijelac in Tutnjevac, Proleter in Ugljevik Selo, Borac in Ugljevicka Obrijez, Majevica in Donja Zabrdje, Hajduk in Mezgraja and Granicar in Korenita.

Notable people

 Filip Višnjić

Twin towns – sister cities

Ugljevik is twinned with:
 Beočin, Serbia

References

 Official results from the book: Ethnic composition of Bosnia-Herzegovina population, by municipalities and settlements, 1991. census, Zavod za statistiku Bosne i Hercegovine - Bilten no.234, Sarajevo 1991.

External links

 

 
Populated places in Ugljevik
Cities and towns in Republika Srpska